Enteromius stigmatopygus is a species of ray-finned fish in the genus Enteromius. It is found in the Nile, Niger and Volta rivers systems, it is also found in rivers in Guinea-Bissau and the Chad and Bandama rivers.

Footnotes 

 

Enteromius
Fish described in 1903
Taxa named by George Albert Boulenger